Headquarters Wales was a district command of the British Army from 1967 and 1991.

History

The district was formed from 53rd (Welsh) Infantry Division as part of the Territorial Army Volunteer Reserve in 1967. It had its headquarters at The Barracks, Brecon, and was placed under the command of HQ UK Land Forces in 1972. In 1991, the first of the minor districts to be amalgamated were North West District, the former West Midlands District (by then Western District) and Wales, to form a new Wales and Western District. It was disbanded again on the formation of HQ Land Command in 1995.

Commanders
General officers commanding included:
Headquarters Wales
1967–1968 Major-General Douglas Darling
1968–1970 Major-General Jeremy Spencer-Smith
1970–1973 Major-General John Woodrow
1973–1976 Major-General Peter Leuchars
1976–1978 Major-General John Graham
1978–1980 Major-General Arthur Stewart-Cox
1980–1983 Major-General Lennox Napier
1983–1985 Major-General Peter Chiswell
1985–1987 Major-General Peter de la Billière
1987–1990 Major-General Morgan Llewellyn
1990–1991 Major-General Peter Davies
Wales and Western District
1991–1994 Major-General Michael Regan
1994–1995 Major-General Ian Freer

References

Districts of the British Army
Military units and formations established in 1967
Military units and formations disestablished in 1995